Günther Kohlmey (27 July 1913 – 25 December 1999) was one of the leading economists in East Germany.

Life
Born in Berlin, Kohlmey became a professor at the German Academy of State and Law in 1949. He directed the Institute of Economics at the German Academy of Sciences at Berlin from 1953 to 1958, and headed the institute's division on the political economy of socialism.

In 1955 he won the National Prize of East Germany.

Works
 Der demokratische Weltmarkt (The democratic world-market), Berlin, 1955
 Das Geldsystem der Deutschen Demokratischen Republik (The monetary system of the German Democratic Republic), Berlin, 1956
 Entwicklungsprobleme des sozialistischen Weltwirtschaftssystems (Development problems for the socialist world economic system), Berlin, 1958
 Vergesellschaftung und Integration im Sozialismus (Socialization and integration in socialism), Berlin, 1973
 Moderne Produktion und Arbeitswerttheorie (Modern production and the labour theory of value), Berlin, 1986

References

External links
 Wolfram Adolphi, In memoriam Guhter Kohlmey

1913 births
1999 deaths
East German writers
20th-century  German  economists
German male non-fiction writers
Members of the German Academy of Sciences at Berlin